"Word of Mouth" is a song by Mike + The Mechanics. It was released in March 1991 as the lead single from their album Word of Mouth. It was the most successful single from that album peaking at No.13 on UK Singles Chart. It also peaked at No.78 in the United States, their last single to chart there, and at No.36 in Canada.

Composition
The song is driven by electric guitar and synthesizer hooks played in unison, as well as the powerful vocal performance of Paul Young, who sings multiple B4 chest voice high notes.  Coupled with layered hand clap and audience effects, the song has a distinctive live, stadium rock sound.

Critical reception
AllMusic lauded the track as a "rousing singalong" and "killer pop song."

Music video
The music video was directed by Paul Boyd and premiered in early 1991.

Charts

Weekly charts

Year-end charts

References

1991 singles
Mike + The Mechanics songs
Music videos directed by Paul Boyd
Song recordings produced by Christopher Neil
Songs written by Mike Rutherford
Songs written by Christopher Neil
Rock ballads
1991 songs